A jamb is the side-post or lining of a doorway or other aperture.

Jamb may also refer to:
 Jamb, Wardha, a town in Wardha district, Maharashtra, India
 Jellia Jamb, a fictional character from the Oz series by L. Frank Baum
 Joint Admissions and Matriculation Board,  Nigeria's official entrance examination board for tertiary-level institutions
 Jamb, Nanded, a village in Nanded district of India